Anadolu Agency (abbreviated AA) is a state-run news agency headquartered in Ankara, Turkey.

History
The Anadolu Agency was founded in 1920 during the Turkish War of Independence by the order of Mustafa Kemal Ataturk. As the empire's capital – İstanbul – was under the caliph's control, all newspapers were also under the caliph's rule along with British occupiers, and it was necessary for the revolutionary government to establish a communication and news network for Anatolia and Rumeli. Journalist Yunus Nadi Abalıoğlu and writer Halide Edip, fleeing the occupied capital, met in Geyve and concluded that a new Turkish press agency was needed. The agency was officially launched on April 6, 1920, 17 days before the Turkish Grand National Assembly convened for the first time. It announced the first legislation passed by the Assembly, which established the Republic of Turkey.

After the Justice and Development Party (AKP) took power, AA and the Turkish Radio and Television Corporation (TRT) were both restructured to more closely reflect the government line. According to a 2016 academic article, "these public news producers, especially during the most recent term of the AKP government, have been controlled by officials from a small network close to the party leadership."

See also
List of news agencies

References

External links
  
 
 

News agencies based in Turkey
1920 establishments in the Ottoman Empire